Rosslyn Park may refer to:
 Rosslyn Park, South Australia, a suburb of Adelaide
 Rosslyn Park F.C., a rugby union team in England